Nirkh or Narkh is a district of about 480 square kilometres (185 sq. mi.) in the east of Wardak Province, Afghanistan. Its population was estimated at 57,000 in 2002, consisting of about 99% Pashtuns, % Tajiks and 1% Hazara. The district centre is Kane Ezzat.

During the presidency of Mohammed Daoud Khan in the 1970s, Nirkh District was planted with many fruit trees; however, these have since dried up in droughts.

Security and Politics
It was reported on 17 November 2009 that Afghan and NATO forces killed one farmer and a militant during an operation.

It was reported on 20 November that a suspected militant was detained when several compounds used by the Taliban for IED and small arms attacks were searched. The incident occurred in Darmandyan.

On 12 May 2021 it was captured by Taliban.

References

 UNHCR District Profile, dated 2002-07-06, accessed 2006-08-18 (PDF).

External links
 Map of Nirkh district (PDF)

Districts of Maidan Wardak Province